Pál Kémery (14 November 1888 – 30 January 1958) was a Hungarian equestrian. He competed in two events at the 1936 Summer Olympics.

References

External links
 

1888 births
1958 deaths
Hungarian male equestrians
Olympic equestrians of Hungary
Equestrians at the 1936 Summer Olympics
Sportspeople from Veszprém County